"Tell Me What It's Like" is a song written by Ben Peters and performed by Brenda Lee.  The song reached #8 on the U.S. country chart and #18 on the Canadian country chart in 1979.  It was featured on her 1980 album, Even Better.  The song was nominated for the Grammy Award for Best Female Country Vocal Performance.

The song was produced by Ron Chancey and arranged by Bergen White.

References

1979 songs
1979 singles
Songs written by Ben Peters
Brenda Lee songs
Song recordings produced by Ron Chancey
MCA Records singles